Møysalen is a mountain in Nordland county, Norway. It is located on the border of the municipalities of Sortland and Lødingen. The mountain is located within Møysalen National Park, about  straight east of the villages of Hennes and Kaljord in Hadsel Municipality.

Name
The name derives from the Norwegian words "møy", which translates to maiden, and "sal", which can be translated into either saddle or hall. South of the peak is two smaller peaks, named Lille Møya (The Small Maiden) and Store Møya (The Big Maiden), which according to local folklore were two troll maidens that were turned into stone. Møysalen is either the saddle or the roof of the hall of these two maidens.

See also
 List of mountains in Norway by prominence

References

Lødingen
Sortland
Mountains of Nordland